Marcus Edward Jones (born August 15, 1973) is an American former mixed martial artist fighter and former college and professional American football player who was a defensive end in the National Football League (NFL) for seven seasons.  He played college football for the University of North Carolina, and was recognized as a consensus All-American.  A first-round pick in the 1996 NFL Draft, he played professional football for the NFL's Tampa Bay Buccaneers.  After retiring from the NFL, he became a mixed martial arts fighter, and was a cast member of SpikeTV's The Ultimate Fighter: Heavyweights.

Early years
Jones was born in Jacksonville, North Carolina.  He attended Southwest Onslow High School in Jacksonville, and played high school football for the Southwest Stallions.  Jones accepted an athletic scholarship to attend the University of North Carolina, where he played for the North Carolina Tar Heels football team from 1992 to 1995. He set the Tar Heels' career sack record (subsequently broken by Greg Ellis), and was recognized as a consensus first-team All-American in 1995.

Professional football
Jones played his entire active professional career with the Buccaneers, playing in 85 games, starting 39 of them, and recording 24 sacks. He was released by the Buccaneers in October 2002. He was signed by the Buffalo Bills, but was placed on injured reserve and was waived after suffering a knee injury.

Mixed martial arts career

Jones trained under Rob Kahn in Gracie Tampa in Tampa, Florida.  He made his professional MMA debut on October 26, 2007, in World Fighting Championships 5 with a victory over Will Mora.  In his next fight, Jones took on Eduardo Boza, and defeated him  via technical knockout midway through round one.

Jones took his first loss to Daniel Perez. Jones won two fights in a row after the loss before being selected to appear on the tenth season of The Ultimate Fighter.

The Ultimate Fighter
Jones was a competitor on The Ultimate Fighter which began filming on June 1, 2009 and started airing on September 16, 2009. During pre-selection training, Jones was shown to struggle with a lack of stamina which potentially led to him being one of the final picks for Team Rampage.

During the competition, Jones suffered through problems in the house, such as a slight knee injury as well as a severe case of sweating, prompting concerns about his availability for the competition. Upon recovery, Jones had his first fight against Team Rashad's Mike Wessel, winning via armbar submission in the first round, making him the only member of Team Rampage to make it past the preliminary rounds. In the quarterfinals, Jones gave Darrill Schoonover his first mixed martial arts defeat by knocking Schoonover out. Jones was defeated in a semifinal bout against Brendan Schaub by KO in the first round. Jones returned for the finale to square off against Matt Mitrione, where Jones suffered another ko in the second round. After this fight, he decided to retire from MMA so he could spend more time with his family.

Mixed martial arts record

|-
|Loss
|align=center|4–2
|Matt Mitrione
|KO (punch)
|The Ultimate Fighter: Heavyweights Finale
|
|align=center|2
|align=center|0:10
|Las Vegas, Nevada, United States
| 
|-
|Win
|align=center|4–1
|John Juarez
|TKO (punches)
|XCF 1: Rumble in Racetown
|
|align=center|1
|align=center|1:39
|Daytona Beach, Florida, United States
|
|-
|Win
|align=center|3–1
|Mike Ottman
|TKO (punches)
|Revolution Fight Club 2
|
|align=center|1
|align=center|1:24
|Miami, Florida, United States
|
|-
|Loss
|align=center|2–1
|Daniel Perez
|KO (punches)
|WFC 6: Battle in the Bay
|
|align=center|1
|align=center|1:26
|Tampa, Florida, United States
|
|-
|Win
|align=center|2–0
|Eduardo Boza
|TKO (punches)
|Revolution Fight Club 10: Bad Blood
|
|align=center|1
|align=center|2:32
|Tampa, Florida, United States
|
|-
|Win
|align=center|1–0
|Will Mora
|Submission (kimura)
|World Fighting Championships 5
|
|align=center|1
|align=center|1:02
|Tampa, Florida, United States
|

Mixed martial arts exhibition record

|-
|Loss
|align=center|2–1
|Brendan Schaub
|KO (punches)
|The Ultimate Fighter: Heavyweights
|
|align=center|1
|align=center|2:11
|Las Vegas, Nevada, United States
|
|-
|Win
|align=center|2–0
|Darrill Schoonover
|KO (punches)
|The Ultimate Fighter: Heavyweights
|
|align=center|1
|align=center|N/A
|Las Vegas, Nevada, United States
|
|-
|Win
|align=center|1–0
|Mike Wessel
|Submission (armbar)
|The Ultimate Fighter: Heavyweights
|
|align=center|1
|align=center|N/A
|Las Vegas, Nevada, United States
|

References

External links
 
 
 Pro-Football-Reference.com

1973 births
Living people
African-American mixed martial artists
All-American college football players
American football defensive ends
American male mixed martial artists
Buffalo Bills players
Heavyweight mixed martial artists
Mixed martial artists from North Carolina
North Carolina Tar Heels football players
People from Jacksonville, North Carolina
Tampa Bay Buccaneers players
21st-century African-American sportspeople
20th-century African-American sportspeople